Group E of the 2014 FIFA World Cup consisted of Switzerland, Ecuador, France, and Honduras. Play began on 15 June and ended on 25 June 2014. The top two teams, France and Switzerland, advanced to the round of 16.

Teams

Notes

Standings

France advanced to play Nigeria (runner-up of Group F) in the round of 16.
Switzerland advanced to play Argentina (winner of Group F) in the round of 16.

Matches

Switzerland vs Ecuador
The two teams had never met before.

Ecuador took the lead in the first half when Walter Ayoví's free kick was headed in by Enner Valencia. Switzerland equalised early in the second half from another set-piece, Ricardo Rodríguez's corner kick headed in by half-time substitute Admir Mehmedi.
The winning goal of the match was scored by another substitute Haris Seferovic in the 93rd minute of the game with just 20 seconds remaining in injury time. A Swiss breakaway started in their own penalty area when Valon Behrami won the ball, and finished by Seferovic converting Rodríguez's cross.

This was Switzerland's first World Cup win over South American opposition in six attempts.

France vs Honduras
The two teams had never met before.

The match started without the national anthems being played before the kick-off, which FIFA later said was due to an audio system malfunction. France took the lead in the first half on a penalty kick converted by Karim Benzema, which was awarded on a foul by Wilson Palacios on Paul Pogba, for which Palacios received his second yellow card and was sent off.
An own goal by Honduras goalkeeper Noel Valladares early in the second half gave France a two-goal lead. Benzema's shot rebounded off the post and then hit Valladares, and despite his effort to scoop it clear, the ball was indicated by goal-line technology to have crossed the line and the goal was awarded. France completed the scoring when Benzema scored his second goal, as he blasted in the rebound after Mathieu Debuchy's shot was inadvertently blocked by Patrice Evra and fell to him in the penalty area.

The second goal was the first time that a goal was awarded in the World Cup with the support of goal-line technology. There was some confusion when the animated replay of the goal was shown in the stadium, however, as when the ball first hit the post, causing "NO GOAL" to correctly flash onto screens in the stadium, it then hit Valladares and crossed the line, producing "GOAL" on the screen. The initial flash of "NO GOAL" drew boos from fans, caused a commotion among the managers and players on the sideline, and led to confusion even from the BBC's experienced television commentator Jonathan Pearce, who required his colleague Martin Keown to explain the incident to him. In response to the confusion, FIFA promised to review how the replays are shown in the future for similar incidents.

Stretching back to their last match of the 1982 World Cup, this was the fifth consecutive World Cup match that Honduras failed to score a goal, matching the record held by Bolivia (1930–1994) and Algeria (1986–2010).

Switzerland vs France
The two teams had met in 36 previous matches, including in the 2006 FIFA World Cup group stage, a 0–0 draw.

France took the lead in the 17th minute when Olivier Giroud headed in Mathieu Valbuena's corner. Almost straight from the restart, Karim Benzema intercepted a Swiss pass and set up Blaise Matuidi to increase the lead. Later, Benzema was tripped by Johan Djourou in the penalty box, but his penalty was saved by Swiss goalkeeper Diego Benaglio and Yohan Cabaye shot the rebound onto the crossbar. A quick counter-attack saw Giroud cross for Valbuena and France took a 3–0 lead at half time.
France added two more goals in the second half, first Paul Pogba crossing for Benzema to score, then Benzema setting up Moussa Sissoko. While the referee was blowing the final whistle, Karim Benzema scored a sixth goal at the end of the match, causing some confusion for a short while about the final score. Switzerland scored two late consolation goals, from a long-range free kick by substitute Blerim Džemaili, and a volley by Granit Xhaka after a pass by Gökhan Inler.

Giroud's goal was France's 100th goal in the World Cup, joining four other countries to have achieved this feat (Brazil, Germany, Italy and Argentina).

Honduras vs Ecuador
The two teams had met in 14 previous matches, all in friendlies, most recently in 2013, a 2–2 draw. The two coaches, fellow Colombians Luis Fernando Suárez and Reinaldo Rueda, had previously managed their opponents: Suárez managed Ecuador in the 2006 World Cup, while Rueda managed Honduras in the 2010 World Cup. Honduras midfielder Wilson Palacios was suspended for the match, having received a red card against France.

Honduras took the lead in the first half when Carlo Costly collected goalkeeper Noel Valladares's long clearance to score with his left foot.
Ecuador, which needed at least a point to stay alive in the competition, equalised three minutes later when Juan Paredes's shot was deflected and Enner Valencia turned the ball in at the far post from close range. Enner Valencia scored the game winner in the second half, heading in a free kick from Walter Ayoví.

Costly's goal snapped Honduras's 511-minute World Cup scoreless streak stretching back to 1982, second place at the time to the record of 517 minutes between 1930 and 1990 held by Bolivia. Enner Valencia's brace gave him three total goals in the tournament, and he joined Agustín Delgado as the country's joint top scorer in the World Cup.

Honduras vs Switzerland
The two teams had met in one previous match, in the 2010 FIFA World Cup group stage, a 0–0 draw.

All three goals of the match were scored by Xherdan Shaqiri. In the sixth minute, he received the ball from Stephan Lichtsteiner, dribbled inside and curled the ball into the net with his left foot. In the 31st minute, a break-away by Switzerland saw Josip Drmić setting up Shaqiri to convert. Shaqiri completed his hat-trick in the 71st minute, from another break-away and assist by Drmić.

As Ecuador drew with France in the other match taking place simultaneously, Switzerland sealed a place in the knockout stage as the group runners-up, while Honduras, which needed a win to have any chance of qualifying for the knockout stage for the first time, were eliminated with zero points.

Shaqiri's hat-trick was the 50th hat-trick in the history of the World Cup, and also the second by a Swiss player, following Josef Hügi in the 1954 World Cup. Honduras completed their third World Cup tournament still without a win, and had played more matches (nine total) without a win than any other side.

Ecuador vs France
The two teams had met in one previous match, in a friendly in 2008, won 2–0 by France. France midfielder Yohan Cabaye was suspended for the match due to accumulation of yellow cards.

The match finished goalless, with the point enough to confirm France's place in the knockout stage, winning the group with seven points. Ecuador, which had to match Switzerland's result in the final match to have any chance of qualification, had captain Antonio Valencia sent off in the second half after a high tackle on Lucas Digne.
As Switzerland defeated Honduras in the other match played at the same time, Ecuador was eliminated, thus being the only team in the CONMEBOL group to fail to advance to the Round of 16.

References

External links

2014 FIFA World Cup Group E, FIFA.com

Group E
Switzerland at the 2014 FIFA World Cup
Group
Ecuador at the 2014 FIFA World Cup
Group